SLNS Sagara (Sagara meaning: Sea) is an Offshore Patrol Vessel (OPV) of the Sri Lanka Navy. It was formerly the ICGS Varaha (41), a Vikram-class offshore patrol vessel of the Indian Coast Guard, leased to Sri Lanka in 2006 and was handed over to the Sri Lanka Navy in 2015.

History
Commissioned on 11 March 1992, CGS Varaha (41) served with the Indian Coast Guard until she was leased to Sri Lanka in 2006. In August 2015 Sri Lanka acquired the ship for permanent use.

Operations
Since 2006, SLNS Sagara was tasked with deep sea patrolling both within the Sri Lankan territorial waters and in international waters to curb ongoing arms smuggling by the LTTE during the Sri Lankan Civil War. In the later stages of the war after undergoing a major refit in India, Sagara, along with other OPVs of the Sri Lankan Navy, has been able to successfully intercept several ships smuggling arms for the LTTE. In all these cases the ships were sunk when they attacked the naval vessels with mortars.

References

External links
www.bharat-rakshak.com
Varaha sees action

Ships of the Sri Lanka Navy
Naval ships of Sri Lanka
1992 ships
Ships built in India